Sommery is a commune in the Seine-Maritime department in the Normandy region in northern France.

Geography
Three streams within the commune's territory feed the river Béthune. Sommery station has rail connections to Rouen and Amiens.

Population

Places of interest
 An eighteenth-century cider press at the seventeenth-century Bray farm.
 The church of St. Vaast, dating from the thirteenth century.

See also
Communes of the Seine-Maritime department

References

Communes of Seine-Maritime